Gordona is a comune (municipality) in the Province of Sondrio in the Italian region Lombardy, located about  north of Milan and about  northwest of Sondrio, on the border with Switzerland.

Gordona borders the following municipalities: Cama (Switzerland), Livo, Lostallo (Switzerland), Menarola, Mese, Prata Camportaccio, Samolaco, Verdabbio (Switzerland).

History
With the approval of the regional law in n. 35 of the Lombardy Region on 6 November 2015, the former municipality of Menarola was merged by incorporation into the municipality of Gordona, restoring the situation prior to a decision by the Grisons in the 18th century.

Demographic evolution

References

External links
 www.comune.gordona.so.it/

Cities and towns in Lombardy